Arif Defri Arianto (born December 28, 2002), known professionally as Defri Juliant, is an Indonesian singer and actor. He rose to fame for being a finalist of the third season of Liga Dangdut Indonesia representing the province of Riau, broadcast by the Indonesian television channel Indosiar in 2020. After the competition, Juliant has released an album and five singles. He also participated in the D'Academy 5 competition representing Kampar Regency.

Life and career

2002–2019: Early life
Arif Defri Arianto was born on December 28, 2002. He was born and raised in Bangkinang, Kampar, Riau to Julianto dan and Susilawati. He came from a family of musicians, both of his parents work as stage singers. He is the third of five children, with older brothers Andre Fikri Akbar and Nugie Riandi Jufenel and younger brothers Muhammad Haikal Julsie and Noufal Oktaviano. His younger brother, Haikal, died in a motorcycle accident on February 10, 2020. Juliant has had a hobby of singing since childhood, he started singing at the age of 9. Juliant was educated at SD Negeri 008 Langgini and SMP Negeri 2 Bangkinang Kota.  While in high school at SMK Negeri 1 Kuok majoring in Freshwater Fishery Agribusiness, he often won singing competitions such as 2nd place in FLS2N Vocational school Kampar Regency in 2017 and 2018. In 2017, Juliant was elected as Riau Youth Ambassador 2017. He was also selected as the third winner Bujang Kampar in the 2018 Bujang Dara event in Kampar Regency. In 2019, he auditioned for 2019 Liga Dangdut Indonesia, but only reached the Video Booth stage and was not called to be the representative of the province at that time. In the same year, he participated in the TVRI Riau Dangdut Star event. Juliant is currently studying at STISIP Persada Bunda majoring in Communication Studies.

2020–2021: Liga Dangdut Indonesia and career beginnings
Juliant returns to audition for the 2020 Liga Dangdut Indonesia competition. He was chosen to be one of the five participants representing Riau. Juliant competed for two tickets to represent Riau Province in front of the judges. For his performances through the songs "Keangkuhan", "Madu", and "Syahdu" (a duet with Rara), he was declared qualified to take part in the final concert on the 2020 Liga Dangdut Indonesia stage.

Seventy participants who passed to the 2020 Liga Dangdut Indonesia Final Concert round were divided into fourteen groups (seven groups of red teams and seven groups of white teams). In the Top 70 round, Juliant made his first appearance on the fourteenth day, singing again the song "Keangkuhan" by original artist Wawa Marisa. In that round, he advanced to the Top 56 round. In the Top 56 round, he performed the song "Kehilangan" by original singer Rhoma Irama. He advanced to the next round with the highest percentage result.

After his performance which always gets the highest percentage result in every round, Juliant was eliminated in the Top 18 round when he sang Jamal Abdillah's "Gadis Melayu". He has a fandom called Fandef.

In August 2021, Juliant through Koko Record HD released his debut single entitled "Tiara Ku Di Pulau Batam" which was composed by Rio Astar. A week after the release of his debut single, he duets with fellow 2020 Liga Dangdut Indonesia participant, Puspa Indah, released a song titled "Cinta Mati" which was composed by Evan Budyana. The next month, he returned to a duet with Puspa Indah, releasing a song titled "Seringgit Dua Kupang" which was also composed by Rio Astar. Juliant released another solo single "Pemburu Harta" in October.

Koko Record released Defri Juliant's debut album whose title is a homonym of his name, Defri Juliant on February 16, 2022, with "Tiara Ku Di Pulau Batam" as a lead single. After his contract with Koko Record ended, Juliant produced his own songs under his independent label Julshie Entertainment. He released first independent single, "Biarkan Semua Berlalu" on May 13, 2022. The song is a Malay pop genre based on the story of his past which was written with Ali Ocumond and the music was arranged by Decky Ryan. His second independent single, "Ibu" was released on July 15, 2022. The song was dedicated to his mother as a birthday gift.

2022–present: D'Academy and acting debut
Two years after the Liga Dangdut Indonesia competition, Juliant returned to compete in a talent search event broadcast by Indosiar. He had the opportunity to D'Academy 5 artist jury audition, performing "Milikku" by A. Rafiq and winning a golden ticket. Juliant was again passed the final audition by performing "Doa Suci" by Imam S. Arifin, "Hilang Tak Berkesan" by Muchsin Alatas and "Pandangan Pertama" by A. Rafiq. The video of his performance with ""Pandangan Pertama" in final audition has entered the Indonesian YouTube trending. After his performance at the DA 5 Final Audition which received high enthusiasm, Koko Record released the music video "I Love You" on August 27, his duet with Puspa Indah has previously been released as the opening track of his first album.

In the Fifty-Fifty round, Juliant performed a duet "Bunga Surga" by Rhoma Irama and "Datang untuk Pergi" by Elvy Sukaesih with Lingling. They performance earned standing ovation from the entire jury but he was eliminated in this round. Juliant had the opportunity to perform in the Wildcard round and received three standing ovations from the judges when he performed Muchsin Alatas' "Sudah Tahu Aku Miskin", but he failed to return to the competition.

After failing to advance in D'Academy 5, Juliant got the opportunity to make his acting debut. He starred in Pintu Berkah television film by Mega Kreasi Films.

Artistry

Influences and musical style
In an interview with Tribun, Defri said that his idols in dangdut music were Erie Suzan and Mansyur S. His musical style was also heavily influenced by his childhood music, which was dangdut. In addition, Defri is also influenced by the music of his native region where he has released a single with the Malay genre.

Stage name

At the beginning of the Liga Dangdut Indonesia competition, Defri used the mononym Arif for the stage name. It was later changed to Defri because there is participants with the same name. After the competition, Defri created a last name for his stage name, Juliant, from his father name Julianto.

Discography

Album
 Defri Juliant (2022)

Singles

Filmography

References

External links

 
 

Living people
2002 births
21st-century Indonesian male singers
Indonesian pop singers
Indonesian dangdut singers
21st-century Indonesian male actors
Indonesian male television actors
People from Riau